Charles Boone (1729?–1819), of Barking Hall, Suffolk and Lee Place, Kent, was an English politician.

Boone was the son of Charles Boone of Rook's Nest, in Tandridge, and Godstone, Surrey. His second wife was Mary Evelyn, widow of George Evelyn of Godstone, and daughter of Lt.-Col. Thomas Garth of Harrold, Bedfordshire.

He was a Member (MP) of the Parliament of England for Castle Rising from 25 February 1757 to 1768, for Ashburton in 1768–84 and for Castle Rising in 1784–96.

References

1729 births
1819 deaths
People from Lee, London
People from Mid Suffolk District
British MPs 1754–1761
British MPs 1761–1768
British MPs 1768–1774
British MPs 1774–1780
British MPs 1780–1784
British MPs 1784–1790
British MPs 1790–1796
Members of the Parliament of Great Britain for Ashburton